Carloman II ( 866 – 6 December 884) was the King of West Francia from 879 until his death. A member of the Carolingian dynasty, he and his elder brother, Louis III, divided the kingdom between themselves and ruled jointly until the latter's death in 882. Thereafter Carloman ruled alone until his own death. He was the second son of King Louis the Stammerer and Queen Ansgarde.

Upon Louis the Stammerer's death, some Frankish nobles advocated electing Louis III as the sole king, but eventually both brothers were elected kings. They were both crowned in September 879. Some doubts were cast upon the legitimacy of their birth, but these disappeared after their victory over the Vikings on November of that year. In March 880 the brothers divided their father's realm at Amiens, Carloman receiving the southern kingdoms of Burgundy and Aquitaine.

Meanwhile, the powerful Duke Boso of Provence had renounced his allegiance to both brothers and had been elected King of Provence on October 879. In 880 Carloman and Louis III marched against Boso and took the northern parts of his realm, starting a two-year siege in Vienne. The city was finally taken by Richard, Duke of Burgundy, in 882.

Carloman II died near Les Andelys while hunting on December 884. He was accidentally stabbed in the leg by his servant Bertoldus while they were attacked by a wild boar. Carloman survived but died seven days later, on 5–6 December. He was only about 18 years old. Some modern sources give his death date as 12 December, but this is not corroborated by contemporary sources. Carloman's land were inherited by his cousin, the emperor Charles the Fat.

References

860s births
884 deaths
9th-century kings of West Francia
Medieval child monarchs
Frankish warriors
Burials at the Basilica of Saint-Denis
Year of birth uncertain
9th-century people from West Francia
Carolingian dynasty